Diego Mateo Casas López (born March 4, 1995) is a Uruguayan footballer who plays as a forward for Deportivo Maldonado in the Paraguayan Primera División.

Career
Casas began his career in 2012 with River Plate Montevideo, where he played for three seasons.

References

1995 births
Living people
People from Rivera Department
Uruguayan footballers
Uruguayan expatriate footballers
Club Atlético River Plate (Montevideo) players
Villa Española players
Juventud de Las Piedras players
Sportivo Luqueño players
Sud América players
C.A. Cerro players
Deportivo Maldonado players
Uruguayan Primera División players
Uruguayan Segunda División players
Paraguayan Primera División players
Association football defenders
Uruguayan expatriate sportspeople in Paraguay
Expatriate footballers in Paraguay